Julio Breff (born Julio Breff  y Guilarte December 8, 1958 in Los Cacaos, Sagua de Tánamo, Cuba) is a self-taught Cuban painter. He specializes in primitive paintings.

Individual Exhibitions
 1988 - "Pintura primitiva. Julio Breff Guilarte", Galería de Arte Mayarí, Holguín, Cuba.
 1989 - "Risas y Más Risas", Galería Espacio Abierto. Revista "Revolución y Cultura", Havana, Cuba.
 1989 - "De la imaginación y los sueños",  3rd Bienal de La Habana, Havana, Cuba.
 2001 - "Julio Breff. A golpe de ensueños", Galería La Acacia, Havana, Cuba.

Collectives Exhibitions
 1987 - "X Feria Nacional de Arte Popular". Sancti Spíritus, Cuba.
 1995 - "Feria Internacional de Arte World Trade Center/Centro Internacional de Exposiciones y Convenciones", México City, Mexico
 1997 - " I Salón de Arte Cubano Contemporáneo", Museo Nacional de Bellas Artes de La Habana, Havana, Cuba.

Awards
 First Prize - " II Salón Nacional de Pequeño Formato, Galería de Arte Universal", Camagüey, Cuba.
 1991 -  Honorable Mention - "12ve Salón Provincial de Artes Plásticas Regino E. Boti", Centro Provincial de Arte, Guantánamo, Cuba.
 1992 - First Prize - "XI Salón Provincial Holguín", Holguín, Cuba.
 1997 - Special Prize - "XI Bienal Internacional del Humor", San Antonio de los Baños, Cuba.

References
  Jose Veigas-Zamora, Cristina Vives Gutierrez, Adolfo V. Nodal, Valia Garzon, Dannys Montes de Oca; Memoria: Cuban Art of the 20th Century; (California/International Arts Foundation 2001); 
 Jose Viegas; Memoria: Artes Visuales Cubanas Del Siglo Xx; (California International Arts 2004);

External links
 City of Mayari, Cuba webpage on the artist 

1958 births
Living people
People from Sagua de Tánamo
Cuban contemporary artists
Cuban painters
Modern painters